William Bryant Milam (born July 24, 1936) is an American diplomat, and is Senior Policy Scholar at the Woodrow Wilson International Center for Scholars in Washington, D.C.

Life
Born in Bisbee, Arizona, Milam grew up in Sacramento, California and currently resides in Washington, D.C.. He received an A.B. from Stanford University and an M.A. in economics from the University of Michigan.

Foreign service career
Milam was a career diplomat. He retired from the United States Foreign Service at the end of July 2001 but was recalled after September 11, and spent nine months helping to set up the multilateral mechanism for the reconstruction of Afghanistan. He was also recalled to serve as interim Charge d'Affairs at the United States Embassy in Tripoli, Libya, prior to the re-establishment of a permanent American ambassadorial post to Libya.  
His last post before retirement was as Ambassador to the Islamic Republic of Pakistan where he served from August 1998 to July 2001.

Milam served as U.S. Chief of Mission in Liberia from November 8, 1995 to August 23, 1998. During his tenure in Liberia, the seven-year civil war was brought to an end, free and transparent elections held, and a new democratically elected government took office. He was U.S. Ambassador to Bangladesh from August 1990 to October 1993, and during that time witnessed the great strides that country made toward more complete democratization.  From November 1993 to September 1995 he was U.S. Special Negotiator for Environmental and Scientific Affairs at the Department of State. In that capacity, he led the U.S. delegation that negotiated the 1994 Desertification Treaty.

Prior to his appointment to Bangladesh, Ambassador Milam was Deputy Assistant Secretary of State for International Finance and Development with responsibility for international finance and development issues, including debt and investment, as well as intellectual property protection. He represented the United States at the Paris Club, the international forum for rescheduling official debt.

In his earlier diplomatic career, Milam served in Martinique, French West Indies; a previous tour in Liberia; in London, and in Yaoundé, Cameroon. His earlier Washington assignments included African affairs, international finance, and international energy policy.
From the Department of State, Ambassador Milam received the James Clement Dunn Award, as the outstanding Class I officer (1981) and a Superior Honor Award (1983). He received a Presidential Meritorious Service Award (1990) and a Presidential Award for Outstanding Service (1991).

Milam also writes monthly op-ed columns for Pakistan's Daily Times newspaper.

Works
;
"Bangladesh and the Burdens of History," Current History, April 2007, vol. 106, No. 699, pp 153–160; 
 "Liberia", Political Finance in Post-Conflict Societies, Center for Transitional and Post-Conflict Governance, USAID, May 2006.

References

External links 
, Woodrow Wilson International Center for Scholars.
Islam and America, Presented to the American Studies Conference, Islamabad, 5 November 1999

1936 births
Living people
Stanford University alumni
University of Michigan alumni
Ambassadors of the United States to Pakistan
Ambassadors of the United States to Bangladesh
United States Foreign Service personnel